The World Forum on Shooting Activities (WFSA) is an association of several national and international associations for shooters, hunters and arms collectors, as well as various arms trading and industry groups. WFSA is one of the few recognized non-governmental organizations to be invited to speak at all five United Nations Small Arms Conferences. The main objective of the association is to support scientific studies, preservation, promotion and protection of shooting related activities on all continents.

History 
In 1996 at the IWA & OutdoorClassics in Nuremberg, several hunting and shooting associations, manufacturers of hunting and sporting firearms, firearm rights organizations
and dealer organizations met and founded WFSA as an umbrella association. The WFSA has become the international arms lobby for privately held firearms, and has over 100 million members in affiliated organizations.

Since 2001 WFSA has, together with the International Action Network on Small Arms (IANSA), been invited to speak at all UN Small Arms Conferences, and participates in national and international preparations (PrepCom) for the upcoming conferences.

Since 2002 WFSA has been a non-governmental organization with consultative status in the United Nations Economic and Social Council (ECOSOC).

The WFSA is seeking a separation of privately held firearms from the UN definitions on Small Arms and Light Weapons (SALW).

Committees 
WFSA consists of four sub-committees.

Legislative Committee
The Legislative Committee has been involved and contributed to all five United Nations Conferences on the Illicit Trade in Small Arms and Light Weapons. It develops solutions for the marking and identification of firearms in order to prevent illegal arms trade. It also tries to create international definitions of firearms and antique firearms, and on how to identify legal and illegal firearms separately.

Image Committee
The Image Committee is intended to convey and publicize the positive aspect of shooting, and for this reason a new ambassador for the committee is elected annually. Previous ambassadors include, amongst others, Chiara Cainero, Superintendent Colin Greenwood, Wilbur Smith, Sir Jackie Stewart, Garry Breitkreuz and Ugo Gussali Beretta.

Environment Committee
The Environment Committee is concerned with protection of the environment, the conservation of biodiversity, the study of the consequences of shooting with lead ammunition in nature and on shooting ranges, and monitors international treaties that may affect hunting and shooting sports and biodiversity.

Statistics Committee
The Statistics Committee gathers information to counter myths and pseudo scientific facts used against hunters and shooters. They also collect data and statistics on the number of hunters and shooters, as well as statistics proving the economic advantage of hunters and shooters on society.

Member associations 
 Asociacion Armera ("The Firearms Association", Spain)
 The European Association of civil commerce of weapons (AECAC, Europe)
 Association of European Manufacturers of Sporting Ammunition (AFEMS, Europe)
 Association of Maltese Arms Collectors and Shooters (AMACS, Malta)
 Associazione Nazionale Produttori Armi e Munizioni (ANPAM, "National Association of Weapons and Ammunition Manufacturers", Italy)
 Bund der Militär- und Polizeischützen (BDMP, "Association of Military and Police Shooting", Germany)
 Bund Deutscher Sportschützen (BDS, "Federation of German Marksmen", Germany)
 British Shooting Sports Council (BSSC, United Kingdom)
 Bundesverband Schießstätten (BVS, "Federal Association for Shooting Ranges", Germany)
 Consorzio Armaioli Bresciani (CAB, Italy)
 Canadian Institute for Legislative Action (CILA, Canada)
 Council of Licensed Firearm Owners (COLFO, New Zealand)
 Conservation Force, A Force for Wildlife Conservation (USA)
 The Danish Arms and Amour Society (DAAS, Denmark)
 Deutscher Schützenbund (DSB, "German Shooting Federation", Germany)
 Danish Sport Shooting Association (DSSA, Denmark)
 European Shooting Confederation (ESC, Europe)
 Association of European Manufacturers of Sporting Firearms (ESFAM, Europe)
 Federation of Associations for Hunting and Conservation of the EU (FACE, Europe)
 Firearms Importers/Exporters Roundtable Trade Group (FAIR)
 Foundation of European Societies of Arms Collectors (FESAC, Europe)
 Finnish Arms Trade Association (Finland)
 Federazione Italiana Tiro a Volo (FITAV, Italy)
 Italian Dynamic Shooting Federation (FITDS, Italien)
 Forum Waffenrecht (FWR, Germany)
 Federaçào Portuguesa de Tiro com Armasde Caça (FPTAC, Portugal)
 Finnish Shooting Sport Federation (FSSF, Finland)
 Institut Europeen des Armes de Chasse et de Sport (IEACS, France)
 Verband der Hersteller von Jagd Sportwaffen und Munition (JSM, Germany)
 Canada's National Firearms Association (NFA, Canada)
 National Muzzle Loading Rifle Association (NMLRA, USA and Canada)
 National Rifle Association of America (NRA, USA)
 National Rifle Association of Norway (NRAN, Norway)
 National Shooting Sports Foundation (NSSF, USA)
 ProTell (Switzerland)
 Sporting Arms Ammunition Manufacturers Association Japan (SAAMA, Japan)
 Sporting Arms and Ammunition Manufacturers' Institute (SAAMI, USA)
 Second Amendment Foundation (SAF, USA)
 South African Gunowners' Association (SAGA, South Africa)
 Safari Club International (SCI, USA)
 Sporting Shooters' Association of Australia Inc. (SSAA, Australia)
 Swedish Forum for Hunting Shooting and Weapons (SVENSKT FORUM, "Svenskt Forum för jakt, skytte och vapenfrågor", Sweden)
 Swedish Pistol Shooting Association (Svenska Pistolskytteförbundet)
 Vlaamse Schutterskonfederatie (VSK,"Flemish Shooting Federation", Belgium)
 VAPENUNIE / UNION ARMES

Literature 
 Denise Garcia: Small Arms & Security: New Emerging International Norms (Contemporary Security Studies). Routledge Chapman & Hall, 2006, .
 Jutta Joachim, Birgit Locher: Transnational Activism in the UN and EU: A Comparative Study. Routledge Chapman & Hall, 2008, .
 Rachel Stohl, Suzette Grillot: The International Arms Trade. John Wiley & Sons, 2009, .
 Wayne LaPierre: The Global War on Your Guns: Inside the UN Plan To Destroy the Bill of Rights. Thomas Nelson, 2006, .

References

External links 
 Official Website
 NGOs and the small arms issue (PDF; 140 kB) by Peter Batchelor at the UN Institute for Disarmament Research (UNIDIR) - How do the NGOs WFSA and IANSA work on government decisions?
 Supporters of the WFSA EEBH Symposium (PDF; 185 kB) Short Biographies

Shooting sports organizations